Gibbosporina bifrons is a species of foliose lichen in the family Pannariaceae. It was described as a new species in 2016 by Arve Elvebakk, Soon Gyu Hong, and Per Magnus Jørgensen. The specific epithet bifrons, meaning "two-faced", refers to the well-developed and large cephalodia that occur with the green algal photobiont. The lichen occurs in the Philippines, Solomon Islands, Malaysia, and New Caledonia.

References

bifrons
Lichen species
Lichens of Asia
Lichens of Oceania
Lichens described in 2016
Taxa named by Per Magnus Jørgensen
Taxa named by Arve Elvebakk
Lichens of New Caledonia